Nan Wai Min (born 1 January 1996) is a footballer from Burma, and a defender for the Myanmar national under-23 football team.

References

1996 births
Living people
Burmese footballers
Myanmar international footballers
Yangon United F.C. players
Association football defenders
Competitors at the 2017 Southeast Asian Games
Southeast Asian Games competitors for Myanmar